Notikewin is a hamlet in northern Alberta, Canada within the County of Northern Lights.

The name derives from nôtinikewin, the Cree word for "battle". The name is shared with the Notikewin River, and is lent to the Notikewin Member, a stratigraphical unit of the Western Canadian Sedimentary Basin.

Climate

Demographics 
Notikewin recorded a population of 17 in the 1991 Census of Population conducted by Statistics Canada.

See also 
List of communities in Alberta
List of hamlets in Alberta

References 

Hamlets in Alberta
County of Northern Lights